Goodwill Entertainments is an Indian film production company and music record label based in the Malayalam film industry. It was founded by Joby George.

History 
The company’s first production was Jo and the Boy (2015) directed by Rojin Thomas and starring Manju Warrier and Sanoop Santhosh. In 2016, its releases were Kasaba (2016) and Annmariya Kalippilaanu (2016). Their next release Captain (2018) won Jayasurya the Kerala State Film Award for Best Actor. In 2018, the company produced the commercial successful crime drama Abrahaminte Santhathikal starring Mammootty. As a music label, they have distributed soundtracks for several films, including Lucifer (2019), Aadhi (2018) and Theevandi (2018).

Production filmography

Soundtrack discography

References

External links 
 Official Website

Film production companies of Kerala
Companies with year of establishment missing